Hope Creek Nuclear Generating Station is a thermal nuclear power plant located in Lower Alloways Creek Township, in Salem County, New Jersey, United States, on the same site on Artificial Island as the two-unit Salem Nuclear Power Plant.  The plant is owned and operated by PSEG Nuclear LLC.  It has one unit (one reactor), a boiling water reactor (BWR) manufactured by GE.  The complex was designed for two units, but the second unit was cancelled in 1981. It has a generating capacity of 1,268 MWe.  The plant came online on July 25, 1986, licensed to operate until 2026. 
In 2009, PSEG applied for a 20-year license renewal, 
which it received in 2011 to operate until 2046. With its combined output of 3,572 megawatts, the Salem-Hope Creek complex is the largest nuclear generating facility in the Eastern United States and the second largest nationwide, after the Palo Verde Nuclear Generating Station in Arizona.

Hope Creek is one of three licensed nuclear power reactors in New Jersey. The others are the two units at the adjacent Salem plant. As of January 1, 2005, New Jersey ranked 10th among the 31 states with nuclear capacity for total MWe generated. In 2003, nuclear plants generated over one-half of the electricity in the state.

Plant features
Hope Creek is a boiling water reactor (BWR) unlike its neighbors at the nearby Salem Nuclear Plant which are pressurized water reactors (PWR).

Hope Creek's reactor is used to produce electricity. The plant's huge natural-draft cooling tower can be seen from many miles away in both Delaware and New Jersey and as far west as Elk Neck Peninsula in Maryland. The cooling tower can be seen from the Delaware Memorial Bridge and the bridges over the Chesapeake and Delaware Canal.  This cooling tower serves only Hope Creek's single reactor. The neighboring Salem units utilize once-through cooling with no cooling tower.

A unique feature of Hope Creek is its cylindrical reactor building complete with a dome which makes it appear similar to a pressurized water reactor containment building which is not typical of boiling water reactors. This similarity is limited to appearance. Like other BWRs, the actual containment vessel for the reactor is a separate drywell/torus structure enclosed within the reactor building, but structurally separate. The outer reactor building serves as secondary containment and houses many of the reactor's safety systems.

Surrounding population

The 2010 U.S. population within  of Hope Creek was 53,811, an increase of 53.3 percent in a decade, according to an analysis of U.S. Census data for msnbc.com. The 2010 U.S. population within  was 5,523,010, an increase of 7.5 percent since 2000. Cities within 50 miles include Philadelphia (43 miles to city center).

Seismic risk
The Nuclear Regulatory Commission's estimate of the risk each year of an earthquake intense enough to cause core damage to the reactor at Hope Creek was 1 in 357,143, according to an NRC study published in August 2010.

Gallery

References

External links

DoE page

Energy infrastructure completed in 1986
Towers completed in 1986
Nuclear power plants in New Jersey
Buildings and structures in Salem County, New Jersey
Towers in New Jersey
Public Service Enterprise Group
Lower Alloways Creek Township, New Jersey
1986 establishments in New Jersey